The following outline is provided as an overview of and topical guide to transport:

Transport or transportation – movement of people and goods from one place to another.

Essence of transport
 Driving involves controlling a vehicle, usually a motor vehicle such as a truck, bus, or automobile. For motorcycles, bicycles and animals, it is called riding.
 Shipping, transporting of goods and cargo, by land, sea, and air
 Travel, movement of people, by land, sea, and air

Types of transport

By availability
 Private transport
 Public transport (public transit)

Modes and vehicles

 Intermodal passenger transport

Aviation

Aviation 
 Fixed-wing aircraft
 Airship (dirigible)
 Autogyro
 Balloon
 Blimp
 Helicopter
 Human-powered aircraft
 Parachute (downward air transport only)
 Rocket
 Projectile (goods only, normally explosives) / Human cannonball
 Supersonic transport
 Zeppelin

Animal-powered transport

Animal-powered transport

Animals domesticated for transport
 Camel
 Dog
 Donkey (burro)
 Elephant
 Homing pigeon
 Horse
 Mule
 Llama
 Ox
 Pigeon (goods only)
 Reindeer
 Yak

Animal-powered vehicles
 Carriage
 Chariot
 Horse-drawn boat
 Sled
 Stagecoach

Cable transport
Cable transport
 Aerial tramway
 Cable car (railway)
 Chairlift 
 Detachable chairlift
 Elevator
 Funicular (inclined plane)
 Gondola lift
 List of aerial lift manufacturers
 Paternoster lift
 chain ferry

Conveyor transport

Conveyor transport
 Conveyor belt
 Escalator
 Moving walkway (moving sidewalk, travelator, and the inclined moving sidewalk, a moving ramp)

Human-powered transport 
Human-powered transport
 Baby transport
 Bicycle
 Boda-boda
 Buggy (cart)
 Filanzane
 Human-powered aircraft
 Ice skate
 Heelies
 Kick scooter
 Litter
 Punt (boat)
 Rickshaw
 Roller skates
 Shopping cart
 Skateboard
 Ski
 Snakeboard
Swimming
 Tricycle
 Unicycle
Walking
Walking bus
 Watercraft rowing
 Wheelbarrow
 Wheelchair

Hybrid transport
 Amphibious vehicle
 Hybrid vehicle
 Moped
 Motorized bicycle

Military transport

Air force transport
 Military aircraft

Army transport
 Armoured fighting vehicle
 Armoured personnel carrier
 Jeep
 Landing craft
 Limbers and caissons (military)
 Mega Tank
 Mini-Tank
 German Panzer

Navy transport
 Aircraft carrier
Escort carrier
 Naval ship
 PT boat
 Submarine
U-boat
 Torpedo boat
Naval Tank ship

Ground transportation
Ground transportation

Motorized road transport
Road transport
 Automobile (car)
 Car body styles
 Auto rickshaw
 Bus
 Midibus
 Minibus
 School bus
 Trolleybus
 Minivan
 Motorcycle
 Share taxi
 Truck
 Trucking industry in the United States
 Unimog
 Van
 Sports car

Motorized off-road transport
Off-road transport
 All-terrain vehicle
 Engineering vehicle
 Hovercraft
 Ice boat
 Snowmobile
 Sport utility vehicle
 Tank
 Traction engine
 Tractor

Rail transport
Rail transport
 Accessibility
 Glossary of rail terminology
 High-speed rail
 Locomotive
 Maglev (transport)
 Monorail
 Mountain railway
 Cable car (railway)
 Funicular
 Rack railway (cog railway)
 Multiple unit
 Diesel multiple unit
 Electric multiple unit (EMU)
 People mover
 Personal rapid transit
 Rail tracks
 Rail transport by country
 History of rail transport by country
 Rapid transit (metro, underground, subway); see also List of rapid transit systems
 Train
 Tram, light rail (streetcar, trolley); see also List of tram and light-rail transit systems

Pipeline transport
Pipeline transport
 Natural gas
 Petroleum
 Pneumatic tube
 Sanitary sewer
 Slurry
 Water

Ship transport
Ship transport
 Barge
 Boat
 Jet ski
 Jetboat
 Lifeboat (rescue)
 Lifeboat (shipboard)
 Narrowboat
 Punt (boat)
 Wherry
 Ferry
Cable ferry
 Horse-drawn boat
 Hydrofoil
 Sailing
 Ship
 Tank ship
 Yacht

Space transport
Space transport
 Interplanetary spaceflight
 Rocket
 Space Shuttle
 Space station
 Spacecraft
 Spacecraft propulsion

Transport on the Moon and Mars
Lunar rover (various, crewed and robotic, Moon, 1971–1973)
Lunokhod programme
Nomad rover (robotic test vehicle, has not been in space, 1997)
Opportunity rover (MER-Brobotic, Mars, 2004)
Sojourner (robotic, Mars, 1997)
Spirit rover (MER-Arobotic, Mars, 2004)

Space transport launched from the surface of the Moon
 Ascent stage of Apollo Lunar Module, crewed, six times, 1969-1972 (return to Earth in the Apollo program)

Transmission
Transmission
 Power transmission
 Electric power transmission
 Telecommunication
 Transmission (telecommunications)

Transportation systems

Networks
 Airlines
 Bridges
 Canals
 Foreshoreways
 Freeways
 Greenways
 Highways
 Motorways
 Personal rapid transit
 Pipeline transport
 Railroads (also called railways)
 Rivers
 Roads
 List of roads and highways
 Cycling infrastructure
 Sidewalks
 Skyways
 Stairways, ladders
 Tunnels

Nodes
 Transport hub
 Airport, Heliport, List of airports
 Air traffic control
 Bus stop (including bus station, bus depot) and tram stop
 Harbor, Port
 Metro station
 Cross-platform interchange
 List of London Underground stations
 Architecture of the Paris Métro
 Junction (road), Parking
 Spaceport
 Train station
 Railway platform

Subsystems
 Air safety
 Containerization
 Continuous track
 Engine
 Foot
 Wheel

History of transport

 Aviation history
 Domestication of the horse
 Horse-drawn vehicle
 Horse transports in the Middle Ages
History of the bicycle
 History of rail transport
 History of rapid transit
 History of the automobile
 List of transport museums
 Maritime history

Theory and design
 Engineering
 Civil engineering
 Highway engineering
 Traffic engineering (transportation)
 Transport engineering
 Fuel efficiency in transportation
 Intelligent transportation system
 Infrastructure
 Locomotion - self-powered motion of a human, non-human animal or vehicle
 Logistics
 Navigation
 Queueing theory
 Resource management
 Sustainable transport
 Tourism
 Ecotourism
 Traffic congestion
 Traffic psychology
 Transport economics
 Transport finance
 Transport Logistic (trade show)
 Transportation forecasting
 Transportation planning
 Travel
 Travel behavior
 Travel class
 Urban economics
 Urban planning

Fictional and proposed future transport

 Broomstick
 Flying car (disambiguation)
 Flying sled (see Santa Claus)
 Interstellar travel
 Launch loop
 Magic carpet
 Moller Skycar M400
 Space elevator
 Starship
 Teleportation
 Transporter (Star Trek)

Transport by region
 United States Department of Transportation
 Worldwide transportation infrastructure

Transport lists

Transportation:

Aviation articles:
Aircraft • Manufacturers • Engines • Engine manufacturers • Weapons • By date and usage

Aviation accidents and incidents:  By airline • By location • By year

Airports:  AU • BE • FR • GR • JP •  PL • UK

History:
Transport museums

Land transport:
Automobiles:  Manufacturers • Truck types • Convoy codes

Cycles:  Bicycle parts • Bicycle types • Motorcycle manufacturers

Rail transport:  Heritage railways • Tram and light-rail transit systems • Melbourne tram routes • Metro systems (subways) • London Underground stations • Closed London Underground stations • Melbourne railway stations • Closed Melbourne railway stations • Named passenger trains • UK railway stations

Road systems:
Roads and highways:  Highways in Australia • UK motorways • Interstate Highways in the U.S. • U.S. Numbered Highways • State highways in the U.S.

Bridges:  UK • USA • Longest suspension bridge spans
Tunnels:  NL • NZ • UK

Maritime:  Ships • Fictional ships • Sailing boat types • Marinas

Space transport:  Spacecraft

See also

Index of environmental articles
Outline of vehicles
Journal of Transport and Land Use
List of emerging technologies
Taxicabs by country
Public transport

External links

Institute of Transportation Studies, University of California, Berkeley
"Friedrich List" Faculty of Transportation and Traffic Sciences, Dresden - Germany
Northwestern University Transportation Library

 
Transport
Transport topics
Outline of transport